The Seigle Homestead is a historic house built  and located along Riegelsville-Warren Glen Road in Finesville of Pohatcong Township, the only surviving two story log house in Warren County, New Jersey. It was added to the National Register of Historic Places on November 7, 1977 for its significance in architecture and social history.

See also
 National Register of Historic Places listings in Warren County, New Jersey

References

External links
 

	
Pohatcong Township, New Jersey
National Register of Historic Places in Warren County, New Jersey
New Jersey Register of Historic Places
Houses completed in 1793